Caroline Biggs is an Irish lawyer who has been a judge of the High Court since October 2021. She previously practiced as a barrister where she specialised in criminal law.

Early life 
Biggs attended University College Dublin from where she graduated with a BCL degree in 1995.

Legal career 
She was called to the Irish bar in 1997 and became a senior counsel in 2009. She specialised in criminal law, appearing both for defendants and on behalf of the Director of Public Prosecutions. She acted in cases involving drug offences, assault, sexual offences, tax offences and homicide.

In 2018, she was appointed to chair a group of representatives from government departments and bodies to respond to recommendations on addressing child abuse.

Judicial career 
Biggs was nominated to the High Court in September 2021. She was one of five new judges created to deal with the increase in legal cases as the Covid pandemic eased. Other appointees were Marguerite Bolger, Emily Egan, Cian Ferriter and David Holland. She was appointed on 5 October 2021.

References

Living people
High Court judges (Ireland)
Irish women judges
Alumni of University College Dublin
Alumni of King's Inns
21st-century Irish judges
21st-century women judges
Year of birth missing (living people)